The Tschermakfjellet Formation is a geological formation in Svalbard, Norway, a subunit of the Kapp Toscana Group. The formation dates to the Late Triassic (early Carnian).

Description 
It is named after the mountain of Tschermakfjellet in Dickson Land at Spitsbergen, while its type section is found at Botneheia in Nordenskiöld Land. The formation has provided fossils of invertebrates and of an indeterminate pistosaurid.

References

Bibliography

Further reading 
 H. J. Campbell. 1994. The Triassic bivalves Daonella and Halobia in New Zealand, New Caledonia, and Svalbard. Institute of Geological and Nuclear Sciences Monograph 4:1-165

Geologic formations of Norway
Triassic System of Europe
Triassic Norway
Carnian Stage
Sandstone formations
Shale formations
Shallow marine deposits
Paleontology in Norway
Geology of Svalbard